Hanna Hemilä is a Finnish film producer, director and writer. Some of her most notable producing credits include Moomins on the Riviera (2014), Le Havre (film) (2011),  Bad Family (film) (2010), Pelikaanimies (2004), and the period film Lapin kullan kimallus (1999). She made her directorial debut with the critically acclaimed documentary feature Paavo, a Life in Five Courses (2010).

Selected filmography

Feature films

Moomins on the Riviera, 2014, producer, co-director, co-writer (Shangai International Film Festival  competition, BFI London Film Festival)
Le Havre, 2011, productrice exécutive (Cannes Film Festival competition)
Bad Family, 2010, line producer (Berlinale)
Varg, 2008, co-producer (Montreal Film Festival)
Pelikaanimies, 2004, producer (Berlinale)
Guarded Secrets, 2004, producer (Cairo International Film Festival - winner best lead actress)
Lapin kullan kimallus, 1999, producer

Documentaries and Tv-series
Tommy's Supersofa, 2013, live action TV-series, producer Paavo, a Life in Five Courses, 2010, director, producer, writerTove ja Tooti Euroopassa, 2004, producerTootletubs & Jyro, 2001, stop-motion animation, producer Behind the Curtains, 2001, producerUrpo & Turpo, Episodes 7-13, 1997, stop-motion animation, producer Urpo & Turpo, Episodes 1-6, 1996, stop-motion animation, producer Kangaroute, 1996, producerHaru, Island of the Solitary, 1994, producerThe Secret of Urpo & Turpo'', 1994, producer

References

External links
 
 Handle Productions Website
 Paavo, a Life in Five Courses 

Living people
Finnish film directors
Finnish women film directors
Finnish film producers
Finnish women film producers
Year of birth missing (living people)